The 1981 Drake Bulldogs football team represented the Drake University as a member of the Missouri Valley Conference (MVC) during the 1981 NCAA Division I-A football season. Led by fifth-year head coach Chuck Shelton, Drake compiled an overall record of 10–1 with a mark of 5–1 in conference play, sharing the MVC title with Tulsa.

Schedule

References

Drake
Drake Bulldogs football seasons
Missouri Valley Conference football champion seasons
Drake Bulldogs football